Gregory Amenoff (born 1948) is an American painter. He is located in the tradition of the early American Modernist painters Georgia O'Keeffe, Charles Burchfield, Milton Avery, Arthur Dove and Marsden Hartley. In the early 80s his work was often associated with a style of painting called organic abstraction and exhibited alongside artists Bill Jensen, Katherine Porter and Terry Winters.

Gregory Amenoff was born in Saint Charles, Illinois, in 1948 to Beatice and C.V. Amenoff. He received a B.A. in history from Beloit College in 1970. He moved to Boston in 1971 where he began his career, showing at the Nielsen Gallery on Newbury Street. He relocated to New York in 1979. In 1980 he began showing with Robert Miller Gallery on Fifth Avenue. Amenoff was included in the 1981, 1985 biennials at the Whitney Museum of American Art. He was also included in An International Survey of Recent Paintings and Sculpture at Museum of Modern Art in 1984 and the 40th Biennial Exhibition of American Contemporary Painting at the Corcoran Gallery of Art, Washington, D.C., in 1987. In the 1990s Amenoff had three traveling solo exhibitions.  A retrospective of works on paper originating at the DeCordova Museum and Sculpture Park in Lincoln, Massachusetts, titled Gregory Amenoff, Works on Paper 1975–1992 traveled to Massachusetts, Tampa Museum of Art, Tampa, Florida, Norton Gallery of Art, West Palm Beach, Florida, Wellington Gray Gallery, and East Carolina University, in Greenville, North Carolina. An exhibition of 19 large scaled paintings called The Sky Below traveled to University of Tennessee Gallery, Knoxville, Tennessee, Sarah Moody Gallery of Art, University of Alabama, Tuscaloosa, Alabama, University Art Gallery, New Mexico State University, Las Cruces, New Mexico, the California Center for the Arts, Escondido, California and the Ringling School of Art Gallery, Ringling School of Art, Sarasota, Florida. Amenoff was also the subject of a two-year traveling show of small paintings Thirty Views, which originated in Syracuse, New York and went to venues in Boston, San Francisco, and elsewhere. From 1986 to 1993 Amenoff showed with Hirschl & Adler Modern on Madison Avenue. He showed at Salander O'Reilly on East 79th Street from 1998 to 2004. He is currently represented by the Alexandre Gallery on 57th Street. He has had several one-person exhibitions at the Stephen Wirtz Gallery in San Francisco, California, James Corcoran Gallery in Los Angeles, California, Gerald Peters Gallery in Santa Fe, New Mexico and Texas Gallery in Houston, Texas.

Amenoff was president of the National Academy of Design from 2001 to 2005. He is a founding member of the CUE Art Foundation, where he served as the curator/governor from 2002 to 2015. He has taught at Columbia University since 1994, where he holds the endowed Chair as the Eve and Herman Gelman Professor of the Visual Arts Program. He served as chair of the Visual Arts Department from 2007 to 2013. He holds an honorary doctorate from the Massachusetts College of Art.

Personal life

Gregory Alexander Amenoff lives and works in New York City and Ulster County. For many years he spent his summers in El Rito, New Mexico. He is married to Sonia Phillips Resika and has three children: Arielle Alexandra Amenoff (born 1984), August Paul Amenoff (born 2001), and Georgia Phillips Amenoff (born 2005)

Collections

Awards
 2011, Guggenheim Fellowship
 1997, 1995, 1993 American Academy of Arts and Letters Purchase Award
 1989, 1981, 1980 National Endowment for the Arts Award (Painting)
 1981, C.A.P.S. (New York State Council on the Arts Award)
 1980, The Louis B. Comfort Tiffany Foundation Award
 1979, The Artist Foundation of Massachusetts Award
 1976, Massachusetts Bicentennial Painting Award

References

Further reading
Amenoff, Gregory. The Sky Below. Massachusetts: Hard Press Editions, 1997.
Amenoff, Gregory. Gregory Amenoff. New York: Hirschl & Adler, 1990.
Amenoff, Gregory.  Gregory Amenoff: An Exhibition of Works on Paper. California: Stephen Wirtz Gallery, 1986.
Amenoff, Gregory.  Gregory Amenoff, April 4–29, 1987. New York: Hirschl & Adler Modern; Limited, 1987.
Doll, Nancy. Inner Natures: Four Contemporary Painters : Gregory Amenoff, Brenda Goodman, Mary Hambleton, Michael Kessler. California: Santa Barbara Museum of Art
Johnson, Ken. "Art in Review; Gregory Amenoff." The New York Times. October, 31, 2008.
Kreimer, Julian. "Gregory Amenoff at Alexandre" Art in America, December 2007.
Pincus-Witten, Robert. Gregory Amenoff. New York: Hirschl and Adler Gallery 1990.

External links
Official website
Gregory Amenoff at Alexandre Gallery

Abstract painters
American landscape painters
Living people
Beloit College alumni
1948 births
Painters from New York (state)
20th-century American painters
American male painters
20th-century American male artists